Greensville County is a county located in the Commonwealth of Virginia. As of the 2020 census, the population was 11,391. Its county seat is Emporia.

History 
Greensville County was established in 1781 from Brunswick County. The county is probably named for Sir Richard Grenville, leader of the settlement on Roanoke Island, 1585.  There is also belief that it may be named after Nathanael Greene, a major general of the Continental Army and one of George Washington's brightest officers.

An early chapter of the National Association for the Advancement of Colored People was formed in Greensville County and Emporia (the county seat) in May 1940, under the leadership of dentist Dr. F. A. Sealy, of Boydton, Virginia and president of the Mecklenburg County, Virginia branch. However he died in 1943, as efforts to desegregate the county's schools began with the assistance of attorneys Oliver Hill. After service in World War II, Hill's colleague Samuel W. Tucker moved to Emporia, married a schoolteacher and became the county's only African American attorney, as well as a leader in desegregating schools across Virginia.

Geography

The Meherrin River forms the boundary between Greensville County and Southampton County.

Adjacent counties / independent city
 Brunswick County, Virginia – west
 Dinwiddie County, Virginia – north
 Sussex County, Virginia – northeast
 Southampton County, Virginia – east
 Northampton County, North Carolina – south
 Emporia, Virginia – surrounded by Greensville County

Major highways
 , the major north–south highway on the Eastern Seaboard enters Greensville County from North Carolina. Access to the county is available at Exits 4, 8, 11 (if you include Emporia) 12, and 13 before the road crosses the Greensville-Sussex County Line.
 , the principal west–east route through southern Virginia at large, including Greensville County. The road connects the Cumberland Gap area of Tennessee to the Hampton Roads area, entering the county from Brunswick County and leaving at Southampton County. A Business Route of US 58 exists within Emporia.
 , the principal south–north route Greensville County and Emporia until it was supplanted by I-95. A spur of US Route 1, it enters Greensville County from North Carolina, serves as a major boulevard in Historic Emporia, and leaves at Sussex County south of Jarratt.
 , a state spur route running northwest of US 301 from through Jarratt both in Greensville and Sussex Counties.
 , a state route briefly entering Greensville County from North Carolina, only to cross into Southampton County at the bridge over the Meherrin River.

Demographics

2020 census

Note: the US Census treats Hispanic/Latino as an ethnic category. This table excludes Latinos from the racial categories and assigns them to a separate category. Hispanics/Latinos can be of any race.

2010 Census
As of the 2010 United States Census, there were 12,243 people living in the county. 59.8% were Black or African American, 38.5% White, 0.3% Asian, 0.2% Native American, 0.3% of some other race and 0.8% of two or more races. 1.4% were Hispanic or Latino (of any race).

As of the census of 2000, there were 11,560 people, 3,375 households, and 2,396 families living in the county.  The population density was 39 people per square mile (15/km2).  There were 3,765 housing units at an average density of 13 per square mile (5/km2).  The racial makeup of the county was 59.75% Black or African American, 38.94% White, 0.10% Native American, 0.40% Asian, 0.02% Pacific Islander, 0.47% from other races, and 0.32% from two or more races.  0.93% of the population were Hispanic or Latino of any race.

There were 3,375 households, out of which 29.30% had children under the age of 18 living with them, 49.80% were married couples living together, 16.00% had a female householder with no husband present, and 29.00% were non-families. 25.40% of all households were made up of individuals, and 11.30% had someone living alone who was 65 years of age or older.  The average household size was 2.51 and the average family size was 2.99.

In the county, the population was spread out, with 18.20% under the age of 18, 7.40% from 18 to 24, 38.70% from 25 to 44, 24.20% from 45 to 64, and 11.40% who were 65 years of age or older.  The median age was 38 years. For every 100 females there were 160.90 males.  For every 100 females age 18 and over, there were 177.80 males.

The median income for a household in the county was $32,002, and the median income for a family was $38,810. Males had a median income of $24,919 versus $19,849 for females. The per capita income for the county was $14,632.  14.70% of the population and 12.40% of families were below the poverty line.  Out of the total people living in poverty, 17.00% are under the age of 18 and 18.60% are 65 or older.

Government and infrastructure
Virginia Department of Corrections operates the Greensville Correctional Center in unincorporated Greensville County, near Jarratt. The facility houses the commonwealth's former execution chamber.

Greensville County has supported the Democratic nominee in every election since 1912, with the exception of 1972 when it backed Richard Nixon during his landslide victory over George McGovern. Its residents did not cast a single vote for Alf Landon in 1936, making the county one of four in which Landon was locked out.

Communities
Although Emporia lies within the boundaries of Greensville County and serves as the county seat, it is an independent city and thus not part of the county. But although they are separate, they do share the same public school system

Town
 Jarratt

Unincorporated communities
 Brink
 Durand
 Low Ground
 Moonlight
 Purdy
 Radium
 Skippers

Education
Greensville County Public Schools operates public schools for the whole county.

See also

 National Register of Historic Places in Greensville County, Virginia

References

External links
 Official website

 
Virginia counties
1780 establishments in Virginia
Populated places established in 1780
Black Belt (U.S. region)
Majority-minority counties and independent cities in Virginia